İbrahim Üzülmez (born 10 March 1974), known by his given nicknames "Deli İbrahim" or "Deli İbo", is a Turkish former professional international footballer who currently manages Eyüpspor.

Playing career
Üzülmez was born to a family of farmers in İzmit, Turkey. He would often sneak out of doing his farmer duties to go play football with friends. It was always his dream to play for Beşiktaş J.K. one day, as he listened to all their matches on the radio.

At the age of 16, he was spotted playing football with his friends in Gönen, some people passing by were so impressed by his skill that they took it upon themselves to call in scouts to watch his play. Gönenspor immediately signed him and he played there for one year. He was then transferred to slightly bigger club Karabükspor. Üzülmez then did his national military duties and on his return, he signed for Turkish Premier League team Gaziantepspor. Gaziantepspor was his first major professional team he played for, he stayed there for 1.5 years. When the transfer season opened, his dreams were made reality when Beşiktaş came knocking on his door. He really shined in the 2002–03 season and was selected for the Turkish National Team. With player Sergen Yalçın's departure from the club and Tümer Metin's shock signing with rivals Fenerbahçe; in 2006, Beşiktaş named its new captain, Üzülmez. His performance against Barcelona in 2000–01 UEFA Champions League group stage still remembered, He helped his team for a famous 3–0 win.

He had a serious accident in June 2008, returning home from his Antalya holidays with his family, he hit another car in the western Turkish city of Manisa and then collided with a tree, but came out safe 

In the second half of the season 2010–11, during the half time break of a league game against MKE Ankaragücü, a fiery quarrel emerged with his teammate İbrahim Toraman in the dressing room. The details of the fight have not been confirmed, but the press commonly announced that Üzülmez lashed out a few punches on Toraman's head and Toraman remained unresponsive until other team members intervened and calmed the two down.

Following the game, Üzülmez's contract was immediately terminated by unanimous board decision, while Toraman was strictly banished from publicly speaking about the occurrence. One day later, club chairman Yıldırım Demirören arranged a press release alongside İbrahim Üzülmez and remarked that Üzülmez was one of the important figures in Beşiktaş history, and that his memory would always be cherished by the community. The chairman further added that Üzülmez's all receivables should be paid in a single sum immediately.

It is still a strong opinion that the occurrence has preceding roots going back to another fight between the duo, at Beşiktaş's 2008 pre-season camp in Austria, which is generally known as the "slipper fight". Being the captain of the team, Üzülmez had asked Toraman about why he came to lunch with slippers, while all other players were wearing their sports equipments. Being the secondary captain of the team, Toraman did not take that lightly and they clenched fists.

On 5 July 2011, it was announced that Üzülmez retired from professional football.

Managerial career
In October 2019, Üzülmez took over as coach of TFF First League side Çaykur Rizespor having agreed a contract until the end of the season.

Career statistics

International

Score and result list Turkey's goal tally first, score column indicates score after Üzülmez' goal.

Managerial

Honours
Beşiktaş
 Süper Lig: 2002–03, 2008–09
 Turkish Cup: 2005–06, 2006–07, 2008–09
 Atatürk Cup: 2000
 Turkish Super Cup: 2006

Turkey
 FIFA Confederations Cup third place: 2003

Individual
Beşiktaş J.K. Squads of Century (Bronze Team)

References

External links

 TFF profile
 
 İbrahim Üzülmez at Footballdatabase

1974 births
Living people
People from İzmit
Association football fullbacks
Turkish footballers
Turkey international footballers
Turkish football managers
2003 FIFA Confederations Cup players
Beşiktaş J.K. footballers
Gaziantepspor footballers
Kardemir Karabükspor footballers
Elazığspor managers
Gençlerbirliği S.K. managers
Çaykur Rizespor managers
MKE Ankaragücü managers
Süper Lig players
Süper Lig managers